Lucas Walker (born 6 December 1984) is an Australian basketball player for the Illawarra Hawks of the NBL1 East. He played 10 seasons in the National Basketball League (NBL) between 2010 and 2020. He played college basketball for Montana State University Billings and Saint Mary's College of California before joining the Melbourne Tigers in 2010. After five seasons with Melbourne, he had stints with the Adelaide 36ers, Perth Wildcats, Cairns Taipans and Sydney Kings. He won an NBL championship with the Wildcats in 2017.

Early life and career
Born and raised in Launceston, Tasmania, Walker attended West Launceston Primary School, Riverside High School and Launceston College. He played three seasons in the South East Australian Basketball League (SEABL), with the Launceston Tigers in 2002 and the North-West Tasmania Thunder in 2003, before moving to Canberra to attend the Australian Institute of Sport and play for the program's SEABL team in 2004.

College career
Walker moved to the United States to attend Montana State University Billings, where as a freshman in 2004–05, he was named the Pacific West Conference Freshman of the Year after averaging 15.5 points and 5.8 rebounds in 20 games (17 starts). As a sophomore in 2005–06, he averaged 11.8 points and 5.5 rebounds in 22 games (17 starts).

In 2006, Walker transferred to Saint Mary's College of California. After redshirting the 2006–07 season due to NCAA transfer rules, he appeared in 25 games off the bench for the Gaels in 2007–08, averaging 3.2 points and 2.4 rebounds per game in 9.3 minutes per game. As a senior in 2008–09, he played 25 games (8 starts) and averaged 2.7 points and 1.6 rebounds per game.

Professional career
Upon returning to Australia, Walker played for the Dandenong Rangers during the 2010 SEABL season before joining the Melbourne Tigers for the 2010–11 NBL season. He played five seasons with Melbourne, with the 2014–15 season marking his final season with the club. In 131 games, he averaged 5.1 points and 3.9 rebounds per game. During this time, he played for the Ballarat Miners in the SEABL in 2013. For the 2015 SEABL season, he returned to the Dandenong Rangers.

For the 2015–16 NBL season, Walker played for the Adelaide 36ers. He returned for another season with Dandenong in 2016.

After having a pre-season stint with the Brisbane Bullets, Walker joined the Perth Wildcats in September 2016 as an injury replacement for Matthew Knight. On 20 October 2016, after Knight was given the all-clear to return to action, Walker was removed from the active 11-man playing roster. Despite being unable to return to the court for the Wildcats for the remainder of the 2016–17 season, Walker remained a big part of the playing group, completed every training session and excelled in his community work off the court. He was subsequently a member of the championship-winning team in March 2017, and at the Wildcats MVP Ball, he was named the recipient of the Coaches' Award. After playing in the Queensland Basketball League with the Mackay Meteors during the 2017 off-season, Walker re-joined the Wildcats for the 2017–18 season as a full-time player. On 8 December 2017, Walker had 12 points and 16 rebounds in an 88–79 win over the Adelaide 36ers. Twelve of his 16 rebounds were offensive, the most ever recorded in the NBL's 40-minute era.

After a short off-season stint with the Frankston Blues in the SEABL, Walker joined the Cairns Taipans for the 2018–19 NBL season. Following the season, the Taipans cut ties with Walker. In April 2019, Walker joined the Nunawading Spectres of the NBL1. In August 2019, he helped the Spectres win the NBL1 championship.

On 2 September 2019, Walker signed with the Sydney Kings for the 2019–20 NBL season.

Walker announced his retirement from the NBL on 1 February 2021.

In March 2022, Walker joined the Illawarra Hawks of the NBL1 East.

Personal
Walker is the son of Robert and Sharyn, and has a sister named Ashleigh.

References

External links

Saint Mary's bio
Take 40: Lucas Walker

1984 births
Living people
Adelaide 36ers players
Australian men's basketball players
Australian expatriate basketball people in the United States
Basketball players at the 2018 Commonwealth Games
Cairns Taipans players
Commonwealth Games gold medallists for Australia
Commonwealth Games medallists in basketball
Forwards (basketball)
Melbourne Tigers players
Melbourne United players
Montana State Billings Yellowjackets men's basketball players
Perth Wildcats players
Saint Mary's Gaels men's basketball players
Sportspeople from Launceston, Tasmania
Sydney Kings players
Medallists at the 2018 Commonwealth Games